The 2007–08 season of the F. League is the 1st season of top-tier futsal in Japan.

Teams

League table

  Nagoya Oceans  Champions of Japan 2007–2008

Award

Fairplay
Shonan Bellmare futsal
 2007 – 08

Individual

Most Valuable Player (MVP)
 Kaoru Morioka (Nagoya)
 2007– 08

References
F. League

External links
F. League

2007 08
2007 in futsal
2008 in futsal